Caroline Queroli (born 5 June 1998) is a French sabre fencer.

She participated at the 2019 World Fencing Championships, winning a medal.

References

External links

1998 births
Living people
French female sabre fencers
World Fencing Championships medalists
21st-century French women